Dimethyl telluride is an organotelluride compound, formula (CH3)2Te, also known by the abbreviation DMTe.

This was the first material used to grow epitaxial cadmium telluride and mercury cadmium telluride using metalorganic vapour phase epitaxy.

Dimethyl telluride as a product of microbial metabolism was first discovered in 1939.
It is produced by some fungi and bacteria (Penicillium brevicaule, P. chrysogenum, and P. notatum and the bacterium Pseudomonas fluorescens).

The toxicity of DMTe is unclear. It is produced by the body when tellurium or one of its compounds are ingested. It is noticeable by the garlic smelling breath it gives those exposed, similar to the effect of DMSO. Tellurium is known to be toxic.

References

External links
Epichem (Commercial supplier datasheet)

Tellurides
Organotellurium compounds
Foul-smelling chemicals
Substances discovered in the 1930s
Tellurium(II) compounds